Alejandro Ilagan Atienza (born January 24, 1967), known professionally as Kim Atienza or Kuya Kim, is a Filipino television host, actor, weather anchor, YouTube vlogger and former politician. He is formerly a resident weather anchor in ABS-CBN's TV Patrols segment, "Weather-Weather Lang". Atienza served as councilor of the 5th District of Manila for three terms. He is known for his famous trivia stints on TV and radio, especially in his own show, Matanglawin. He is currently working for GMA Network.

Atienza is the eldest son of former mayor of Manila and Buhay Party-List Representative Lito Atienza and the brother of Ali Atienza.

Education
In 1983, Atienza entered University of Santo Tomas, where he took up Education as a freshman college student. A year later, he transferred to University of Philippines Diliman, where he would earn his bachelor's degree in Film and Audiovisual Communication. It was revealed that it took him seven years to finish college as he once despised school. However, he clarified that he loved learning so he ensured to do it himself.

Career

Political career (1995–2004)
Atienza has been in politics for twelve years. From 1995 to 2004, he served as councilor of Manila from the 5th district for three terms. One of his notable resolutions that he filed to the city council is the resolution in 1998 declaring actress Claire Danes as persona non grata and banning her films after Danes criticized the state of Manila's cleanliness. In 2004, he ran as representative of the 5th District of Manila but lost to Joey Hizon. His father, then Manila Mayor Lito Atienza, asked him to run for Mayor of Manila in 2007 but he declined and then he retired, thinking that politics are scary.

Radio and television career (1987–present)
He started his broadcasting career in the early 1990s, as the anchor of "Mata ng Agila", an early morning newscast of DZEC Radyo Agila 1062, together with Onin Miranda.

Atienza started his stint on TV when he began hosting Magandang Umaga, Pilipinas' Animalandia as well as voice acting in the 90's. He is also best known for voicing Takeru (renamed as Michael Joe) which is portrayed by Japanese Sentai actor Ryousuke Kaizu from the Super Sentai series, Hikari Sentai Maskman and he also references this in later years when he was being interviewed by fellow celebrity hosts.

He then became ABS-CBN's weather tracker for TV Patrol until he became the show's weather presenter when Ernie Baron died of heart attack in 2006.

He left the early morning show, Umagang Kay Ganda in 2009 to host the late morning variety show It's Showtime (then named Showtime). He began hosting Matanglawin on March 24, 2008.

He returned to radio for the 2nd time overall and also for the first time on DZMM via Sakto with Amy Perez-Castillo, replacing original host Marc Logan who left the show, until he was replaced by Jeff Canoy alongside Johnson Manabat on October 26, 2020, after its merger with Gising Pilipinas. It also aired both on DZMM and DZMM TeleRadyo in 2018.

On September 29, 2021, Atienza announced that he would leave ABS-CBN on October 1 as part of its retrenchment program caused by the ABS-CBN shutdown from the Philippine Congress that junked the new ABS-CBN legislative franchise to operate, as he would transfer to GMA Network. He joined the newscast 24 Oras on October 4, but his eponymous segment of the program titled "#KuyaKimAnoNa" debuted a week later on October 11. He also hosted the talk show Mars Pa More since November 8 and a news magazine show titled Dapat Alam Mo! on GTV since October 18, that serves as pre-programming to 24 Oras, the show also started its provisional simulcast on GMA from February 14 to March 18, 2022. In July 2022, he was named as a host of the new variety show TiktoClock.

Personal life

Family
Kim Atienza is married to Felicia Hung, and they have three children: Jose III, Eliana, and Emman. Atienza is the president and founding member of Chinese International School Manila (CISM). Kim Atienza is an avid marathoner, triathlete and cyclist. Politician Lito Atienza is Atienza's father, while politicians Ali Atienza and Maile Atienza are his siblings.

Health and recovery
Atienza had a stroke in 2010. In 2013, he was diagnosed to have Guillain–Barré syndrome, a rare disease that attacks the nervous system. Atienza totally recovered and has since finished several marathons, 70.3 Ironman and full Ironman races. He continues to compete and lead his age group to this day.

Filmography

Television
Muscles in Motion (1987) (RPN)
Sports Review (1991–1993) (RPN)
Daimos (1993) (IBC-13) as Kazuya Ryuzaki (Richard Hartford) (Voice Dubber)
Hikari Sentai Maskman (1989–1990) (ABS-CBN) (1993–1998) (replayed in IBC-13) as Takeru (renamed as Michael Joe) (Voice Dubber)
Ultraman Ace (1993) (ABS-CBN) as Captain Mura (Voice Dubber)
Magma Man (1993) (ABS-CBN) as Misakey (Voice Dubber).
Voltes V (1999) (GMA) as Kenichi Go (Steve Armstrong) (Voice Dubber)
Magandang Umaga Pilipinas (2004–2007) – host (ABS-CBN)
Umagang Kay Ganda (2007–2009) – host (ABS-CBN)
Kapamilya, Deal or No Deal (2007) (ABS-CBN) – Celebrity player (won the one-million-peso briefcase)
TV Patrol (2006–2021) – weatherman/Weather-Weather Lang and Kaunting Kaalaman segment anchor (ABS-CBN)
Entertainment Live (2008–2012) – Co-Host (ABS-CBN)
Matanglawin (2008–2020) – Host (ABS-CBN)
It's Showtime (formerly called as Showtime) (2009–2016; 2019–2020) – Co-host (ABS-CBN)
Magpasikat (2010) – Co-host (ABS-CBN)
Barangay DOS! (2011) – Host (ABS-CBN)
 24 Oras (2021–present) – #KuyaKimAnoNa segment anchor (GMA Network)
 Dapat Alam Mo! (2021–present) – Main host (GTV & GMA Network)
 Mars Pa More (2021–2022) – Main host (GMA Network)
 TiktoClock (2022–present) – Lead host (GMA Network)
 Zero Kilometers Away (2023) – TBA

Film
Shake, Rattle & Roll 15: Flight 666 (2014) – Kuya Kim's 1st MMFF Movie
 Here Comes the Bride (2010) special participation
Wapakman (2009)
Astig (2009)
Saan Nagtatago Si Happiness (2006) – Kuya Kim's 1st Movie as Tim

Radio
Sakto (DZMM) (2018–2020)

Awards
 29th Star Awards for Television Best Education Program Host – for Matanglawin
 28th Star Awards for Television Best Education Program Host – for Matanglawin
 26th Star Awards for Television Best Education or Children's Program Host – for Matanglawin
 25th Star Awards for Television Best Educational Program Host – for Matanglawin
 24th Star Awards for Television Best Educational Program Host – for Matanglawin
 22nd Star Awards for Television Best Educational Program Host – for Matanglawin
 32nd Star Awards for Television Best Educational Program Host – for Matanglawin
 26th Star Awards for Television Best Game or Reality Show Host – for It's Showtime
 2015 KBP Golden Dove Awards for Best Children's Show – for Matanglawin
 2008 KBP Golden Dove Awards for Best Children's Show – for Matanglawin
 2007 KBP Golden Dove Awards for Best Children's Show – for Matanglawin
 2015 Golden Screen Awards for Outstanding Natural History Wildlife Program Host and Show – for Matanglawin
 2012 Golden Screen Awards for Outstanding Natural History Wildlife Program Host and Show – for Matanglawin
 2011 Golden Screen Awards for Outstanding Natural History Wildlife Program Host and Show – for Matanglawin

References

External links

 GMA Network profile

1967 births
Living people
People from Malate, Manila
Male actors from Manila
Manila City Council members
Filipino television personalities
Kim
Weather presenters
Liberal Party (Philippines) politicians
University of the Philippines Diliman alumni
Filipino television variety show hosts
Filipino game show hosts
ABS-CBN News and Current Affairs people
ABS-CBN personalities
GMA Integrated News and Public Affairs people
GMA Network personalities
Converts to evangelical Christianity from Roman Catholicism
Filipino Christians
Filipino evangelicals
People with Guillain–Barré syndrome
Filipino male voice actors